A speculum (Latin for 'mirror'; plural specula or speculums) is a medical tool for investigating body orifices, with a form dependent on the orifice for which it is designed.  In old texts, the speculum may also be referred to as a diopter or dioptra. Like an endoscope, a speculum allows a view inside the body; endoscopes, however, tend to have optics while a speculum is intended for direct vision.

History

Vaginal and anal specula were used by the ancient Greeks and Romans,  and speculum artifacts have been found in Pompeii. A vaginal speculum, developed by J. Marion Sims, consists of a hollow cylinder with a rounded end that is divided into two hinged parts, somewhat like the beak of a duck. This speculum is inserted into the vagina to dilate it for examination of the vagina and cervix.

The modern vaginal speculum was developed by J. Marion Sims, a plantation doctor in Lancaster County, South Carolina. Between 1845 and 1849, Sims performed dozens of surgeries, without anesthesia, on at least 12 enslaved women. In these experiments, Sims developed a technique to repair fistula and in the process invented the duckbill speculum. These experiments, and the development of the modern specula, led some to regard Sims as the "father of modern gynaecology."

By the 1860s, speculums were integrated into criminal justice practices in the UK. In Great Britain, examinations of the cervix were made mandatory for all women convicted of prostitution by the country's Contagious Disease Act.
In the 19th century, the vaginal speculum became a cultural symbol of the tenuous relationship between women and their physicians. Use of the speculum was generally avoided in medical practices, and most vaginal conditions were diagnosed through symptoms or palpating the abdomen. Many practitioners had moral concerns about the use of the speculum, and preferred to diagnose through palpating the abdomen. As late as 1910, physicians believed the vaginal speculum to be inferior to the "educated touch."

These concerns continued into the early 20th century as the speculum became  commonplace in gynecology practices. Often, nurses played a major role in ensuring the proper use of the speculum during medical exams. The 1946 and 1956 editions of a multi-volume gynecology text for nurses required that nurses remain present during examination to protect both the patient and physician from "blackmail by designing persons."

, 85% of gynecologists are women. As a result of this demographic shift, the procedures around speculum use have also changed.

Construction

Specula have been made of glass or metal. They were generally made of stainless steel and sterilized between uses, but particularly in the 21st century, many — especially those used in emergency departments and doctor's offices — are made of plastic, and are disposable, single-use items.  Those used in surgical suites are still commonly made of stainless steel.

Types
Specula come in a variety of shapes based on their purpose, and a variety of sizes; in any case the cylinder or blade(s) of the instrument allow the operator a direct vision of the area of interest and the possibility to introduce instruments for further interventions such as a biopsy.

Vaginal

The best-known speculum is the bivalved vaginal speculum; the two blades are hinged and are "closed" when the speculum is inserted to facilitate its entry and "opened" in its final position where they can be arrested by a screw mechanism, so that the operator is freed from keeping the blades apart.

A cylindrical-shaped speculum, introduced in 2001, the dilating vaginal speculum (also known as the Veda-scope) invented by Clemens van der Weegen, inflates the vagina with filtered air. (see diagram) The device has two main functions: a) to take a normal Pap smear with a cervical brush or a cytology brush; and b) as an internal colposcope so that the operator can pivot the Veda-scope to view any part of the vagina barrel and cervix facilitated by an internal light source that can illuminate the vaginal wall and cervix with multi-coloured light filters, which can detect pre-cancerous cells with the aid of acetic acid solution and iodine solution. It also has a facility to attach a digital camera for viewing and recording. 

A specialized form of vaginal speculum is the weighted speculum, which consists of a broad half tube which is bent at about a 90 degree angle, with the channel of the tube on the exterior side of the angle. One end of the tube has a roughly spherical metal weight surrounding the channel of the speculum. A weighted speculum is placed in the vagina during vaginal surgery with the patient in the lithotomy position. The weight holds the speculum in place and frees the surgeon's hands for other tasks.
A vaginal speculum is also used in fertility treatments, particularly artificial insemination, and allows the vaginal cavity to be opened and observed thereby facilitating the deposit of semen into the vagina.

Cylindrical shape
 Ferguson
 Glass speculum
 Veda-scope (dilating vaginal speculum)

One blade

Two blades (bivalved)

Three blades

Rectal
Vaginal specula are also used for anal surgery, although several other forms of anal specula exist.  One form, the anoscope, resembles a tube that has a removable bullet-shaped insert.  When the anoscope is inserted into the anus, the insert dilates the anus to the diameter of the tube.  The insert is then removed, leaving the tube to allow examination of the lower rectum and anus.

This style of anal speculum is one of the oldest designs for surgical instruments still in use, with examples dating back many centuries. The sigmoidoscope can be further advanced into the lower intestinal tract and requires an endoscopic set-up.

Tubal shape
 Aniscope

One blade
 Czerny

Two blades

Three blades
 Alan Park
 Cook
 Mathieu

Nasal

Nasal specula have two relatively flat blades with handle.  The instrument is hinged so that when the handles are squeezed together the blades spread laterally, allowing examination.

Additionally, the Thudichum nasal speculum is commonly used in the outpatient examination of the nose.

Aural

Ear or aural specula resemble a funnel, and come in a variety of sizes.

Eyelid

For opthalmic surgery such as cataract surgery, a speculum designed to retract the eyelids is used.

Oral
In veterinary medicine, a McPherson Speculum can be used for oral examination. The speculum helps keep the mouth open during the exam and helps avoid biting injuries.

Non-medical use

Specula are used for sexual pleasure, both vaginally and anally.

See also

References
 Rediker, Marcus
Slave Ship:a human history
Penguin Group, 2007, Page 33, graph 2 : " The man had attempted to cut his own throat and had succeeded in " dividing only the external jugular vein." (To force feed him (the slave) the ships doctor would need to use the speculum oris, "...the long thin mechanical contraption used to force open unwilling throats to receive gruel and hence sustenance."

External links 
 

Gynaecology
Medical equipment